Robert Crowther Abbott  (1869–1927) was the inaugural Bishop of Sherborne.

Robert Crowther Abbott was born into a clerical family: his father was the Rev. A. R. Abbott, sometime Vicar of Gorleston. He was educated at Marlborough College and Trinity College, Cambridge. After 15 years as an assistant master (and latterly chaplain) at his old school he was appointed principal of Salisbury Theological College in 1907. After incumbencies at Great St Mary's with St Michael's, Cambridge,  Holy Trinity, Weymouth, Dorset and St Mary the Virgin, Gillingham, Dorset he was elevated to the episcopate in 1925, but ill health forced his resignation only two years later.

Notes

1869 births
1927 deaths
People educated at Marlborough College
Alumni of Trinity College, Cambridge
Bishops of Sherborne
20th-century Church of England bishops